The conquest of Tunis in 1574 marked the conquest of Tunis by the Ottoman Empire over the Spanish Empire, which had seized the place a year earlier. The event virtually determined the supremacy in North Africa vied between both empires in favour of the former, sealing the Ottoman domination over eastern and central Maghreb, with the Ottoman dependencies in Algiers, Tunis and Tripoli ensuingly coming to experience a golden age as corsair states.

Background

Tunis had initially been conquered by the Ottomans under Hayreddin Barbarossa in 1534. In the next year, however, Holy Roman Emperor Charles V had launched a major expedition and captured it in turn. He established a garrison and a vassal ruler in the person of Lhacène of the Hafsid dynasty. The Bey of Algiers Uluj Ali Pasha captured Tunis in 1569 for the Ottoman Empire, but in the aftermath of the 1571 Christian victory at the Battle of Lepanto, John of Austria managed to take Tunis in October 1573.

Capture of Tunis
In 1574, William of Orange and Charles IX of France, through his pro-Huguenot ambassador François de Noailles, Bishop of Dax, tried to obtain the support of the Ottoman ruler Selim II in order to open a new front against the Spanish king Philip II. Selim II sent his support through a messenger, who endeavoured to put the Dutch in contact with the rebellious Moriscos of Spain and the pirates of Algiers. Selim also sent a great fleet to attack Tunis in the Autumn of 1574, thus succeeding in reducing Spanish pressure on the Dutch.

In the Battle of La Goleta, Selim II mustered a fleet of between 250 and 300 warships, with about 75,000 men. The Ottoman fleet was commanded by Sinan Pacha and Alūj Ali. The Ottoman fleet combined with troops sent by the governors of Algiers, Tripoli, and Tunis, giving a combined strength of about 100,000. The army attacked Tunis and La Goleta; the presidio of La Goleta, defended by 7,000 men, fell on 24 August 1574. The last Christian troops in a small fort opposite Tunis surrendered on 3 September 1574.

John of Austria attempted to relieve the siege with a fleet of galleys from Naples and Sicily but failed due to storms. The Spanish crown, being heavily involved in the Netherlands and short of funds was unable to help significantly.

Miguel de Cervantes, future author of Don Quixote, participated in these events as a soldier, and was among the troops of Don Juan of Austria which tried to rescue the city. He claims that the Ottomans led 22 assaults against the fort of Tunis, losing 25,000 men, while only 300 Christians survived. He wrote about the battle:

Abd al-Malik, the future Moroccan King, participated in the 1574 conquest of Tunis on the side of the Ottomans.

Gabrio Serbelloni was the commander of the fort of Tunis. The general of La Goleta, Don Pedro Portocarerro, was taken as a captive to Constantinople, but died on the way. The captured soldiers were employed as slaves on galleys.

The battle marked the final establishment of Ottoman rule in Tunis, putting an end to the Hafsid dynasty and the Spanish presence in Tunis.

The success of the Turks under Occhiali in the battle of Goleta managed in reducing Spanish pressure on the Dutch, and leading to negotiations at the Conference of Breda. After the death of Charles IX in May 1574 however, contacts weakened, although the Ottomans are said to have supported the 1575–1576 revolt, and establish, in 1582, a consulate in Antwerp (De Turks-Griekse Natie). The Ottomans made a truce with Spain, and shifted their attention to their conflict with Persia in the Ottoman–Safavid War (1578–1590). The Spanish crown fell into bankruptcy on 1 September 1575.

After the truce, Ottoman-Spanish hostilities resumed in 1591, even if they would not reach the magnitude of yesteryear.

See also
 Siege of Castelnuovo
 Islam and Protestantism
 Franco-Ottoman alliance

Notes

References
 Geoffrey Parker, Lesley M. Smith The General crisis of the seventeenth century Routledge, 1978 
 María Antonia Garcés Cervantes in Algiers: A Captive's Tale Vanderbilt University Press, 2005 

Military history of Tunisia
History of Tunis
Tunis
Tunis 1574
Tunis 1574
Tunis
1574 in the Ottoman Empire
1574 in Africa
16th century in Tunisia
Tunis
Tunis